Joseph Franklin Kershaw (2 May 1884 – 14 October 1917) was an English artist, who studied at the Royal College of Art and painted in watercolours and oils. His career was cut short by his death in action in World War 1.

Biography

Life 
J Franklin Kershaw was born in Oldham in 1884, the son of an ironmonger. He was educated at Oldham Technical School, and went on to study for four years at the Royal College of Art in Kensington, London. In 1907, he married Effie Gregory, the daughter of sculptor Thomas Gregory and herself an art teacher. They lived in Fulham while Kershaw studied, and then moved to Milnthorpe in Cumbria.

He was a member of the Lake Artists' Society, an organisation which exhibited the work of local Lakeland artists.

World War I and Death 
In June 1916, Kershaw enlisted into the Border Regiment of the British Army, and in August was transferred to 126th Company, Machine Gun Corps. He was posted to France, and following a short period of convalescence from a shell wound to his shoulder, returned to his company but was killed in action during the First Battle of Passchendaele. He is buried in Coxyde Military Cemetery, Belgium.

Work 
Following his death, Oldham's Municipal Art Gallery held an exhibition of around 70 of Kershaw's paintings. The majority were watercolours, but also included were oil paintings from his days at the Royal College of Art.

Kershaw's watercolours were mainly of local scenes in area surrounding his Lakeland home. But his oil paintings were characterised by mythical and stylised scenes depicting female nudes in natural settings.

An oil painting by Kershaw was included in three Royal College of Art exhibitions: 'The Renaissance of Spring' (1911), 'The Meeting of Spring and Winter' (1912) and 'The Passing of Spring' (1914).

His painting style owes something to the British Impressionists of the late 19th century. Contemporary journalists remarked on the similarity between some of Kershaw's works and those of fellow Oldham artist William Stott.

Four of his oil paintings can be seen online at Art UK, including the RCA exhibits 'The Renaissance of Spring' and 'The Meeting of Spring and Winter'. Three of these paintings are in the collection in Kershaw's home town at Gallery Oldham.

Awards and distinctions 
JF Kershaw was granted a British Institution award in painting in 1908, which had an annual value of £50 for two years. He was awarded a diploma from the Royal College of Art in 1912.

See also 

British artists
Impressionism

References 

1884 births
1917 deaths
British Army personnel of World War I
British male painters
Alumni of the Royal College of Art
British military personnel killed in World War I
People from Oldham
British watercolourists
20th-century British painters
British Impressionist painters
Border Regiment soldiers
Machine Gun Corps soldiers
20th-century British male artists
Military personnel from Lancashire